Whitehall 1212 was a weekly crime drama  radio show in the United States that ran from November 18, 1951 until September 28, 1952. Its cases were taken from the files of Scotland Yard's Black Museum.

History
Whitehall 1212, named after the then famous telephone number of Scotland Yard—the headquarters of the London Metropolitan Police Force—was written and directed by Wyllis Cooper and broadcast by NBC. It was hosted by Chief Superintendent John Davidson, curator of the Black Museum and it used many of the same picked cases by contemporary radio show The Black Museum, and nearly mirrored its broadcast run.  The two shows were different in the respect that while Whitehall 1212 told the story of a case entirely from the point of view of the police starting from the crime scene, The Black Museum was more heavily dramatized and played out scenes of the actual murders and included scenes from the criminal's point of view.

Listen to
Whitehall 1212 episodes on the Internet Archive

Notes

References

American radio programs
1951 radio programme debuts
1952 radio programme endings
NBC radio programs
History of the Metropolitan Police